Douglas Tait (born December 17, 1978) is an American actor, stuntman, and independent filmmaker. Tait has played "monster" and creature characters in several films, including Star Trek, Zathura: A Space Adventure, Thor, and Land of the Lost.

Early life 
Tait was born in Tarzana, California. He attended Bishop Alemany High School in Los Angeles, California, where he played on the high school's basketball team.

Entertainment career

Early work
Tait said in an interview that he was cast as a teen basketball player in television commercials because of his high school basketball experience. His first character role came during high school when he was hired to perform as "Frankenstein" in the live stage shows at Universal Studios Hollywood.

Creature character roles 
He went on to play creature characters in film. He played the role of Jason Voorhees in the final scene of Freddy vs. Jason. He was one of three individuals to play the role of a "Zorgon" in Jon Favreau's Zathura: A Space Adventure. He played the role of "Abominog" in The Knights of Badassdom and a "Frost Giant" in Thor. He appeared as "Head Sleestak" in Land of the Lost

He also played "Long Face Bar Alien" in J. J. Abrams's Star Trek. Makeup artist Barney Burman who, along with Mindy Hall and Joel Harlow, won the 2009 Academy Award for best makeup for their work in Star Trek noted that the work Burman did on Tait's character, Long Face Bar Alien, was especially complex.

In 2009, Tait was a member of the stunt ensemble for the 2008 film Indiana Jones and the Kingdom of the Crystal Skull that was nominated for a Screen Actors Guild Award in the category of "Outstanding Performance by a Stunt Ensemble in a Motion Picture".

In 2019, Tait performed the in-camera shots of the fairy Gruagach for the Hellboy reboot.

Independent film work 
Tait was executive producer, along with Isabel Cueva, of "In The Name of Freedom", a 16-minute short film that appeared at the 14th Annual LA Shorts Fest in 2010. It was an Official Selection of the New York International Latino Film Festival, won in the category of "Best Drama Short" at the 2010 Los Angeles Women's International Film Festival, and won the "Best Fiction Short" category at the 2010 CINE Film and Video Competition.

He both produced and starred alongside Sally Kirkland and Tony Todd in the independent film One by One: Death's Door which, as re-titled Jack The Reaper, was picked up for distribution by American World Pictures.

Tait also starred in the 2008 independent film, The Season, which was screened at the 2011 New York International Independent Film and Video Festival. The film was also screened at the 2008 Melbourne Underground Film Festival, Screamfest Horror Film Festival, ShockerFest International Film Festival and Shriekfest, among others. In 2015, he starred in the Fetish horror film, "The Fiancée." and in the supernatural thriller, "Good Family Times."

References

External links 
 
 

Living people
American male film actors
American male television actors
American stunt performers
Male actors from California
20th-century American male actors
21st-century American male actors
1978 births